Shera Radhuni is a Bangladeshi competitive cooking reality TV show. The show was launched by Square Consumer Products Ltd and first premiered on 2006 on Channel i and then on Maasranga Television from 2012.

Format 
Initial round consist of many contestants from across Bangladesh individually auditioning by presenting a dish before the three judges to gain one of the first 20 places.

Series

Seasons

Season 1 
Shera Radhuni 1412 aired from 7 February 2006 on Channel i. Hosted by Tania Ahmed. Judges were Siddika Kabir and Hosne Ara.

Season 2 
Shera Radhuni 1414 aired from 2008 on Channel i. Judges were Siddika Kabir and Rahima Sultana Rita. It was won by Rowshan Ara Begum.

Season 3 
Shera Radhuni 1418 aired from 11 May 2012 to 30 June 2012 on Maasranga Television. Judges were Rahima Sultana Rita, Nahid Osman and Kalpana Rahman. It was won by Ferdous Zahan Pabon.

Season 4 
Shera Radhuni 1422 aired from 12 December 2015 to 23 February 2016 on Maasranga Television. Hosted by Rumana Malik Munmun. Judges were Subhabrata Moitra and Rahima Sultana Rita. It was won by Sabina Siraji.

Season 5 
Shera Radhuni 1424 aired from 12 January 2018 to 13 April 2018 on Maasranga Television. Hosted by Rumana Malik Munmun. Judges were Subhabrata Moitra, Kalpana Rahman and Dilara Hanif Purnima. It was won by Mahafuzur Rahman.

Season 6 
Shera Radhuni 1427 aired from 2 April 2021 to 9 July 2021 on Maasranga Television. Hosted by Maria Noor. Judges were Subhabrata Moitra, Rahima Sultana Rita and Dilara Hanif Purnima. It was won by Sadia Taher.

Season 7 
Shera Radhuni 1429 aired from 16 December 2022 to 18 April 2023 on Maasranga Television. Hosted by Srabonno Towhida. Judges were Subhabrata Moitra, Rahima Sultana Rita and Dilara Hanif Purnima. It was won by Ayrish Atiyar.

References 

Bengali-language television programming in Bangladesh
2005 Bangladeshi television series debuts
Bangladeshi game shows